Armenian airline Armavia served the following destinations before its bankruptcy in March 2013.

References

Lists of airline destinations